Shaman King: The Super Star is a Japanese manga series written and illustrated by Hiroyuki Takei. It is a spin-off of Takei's original manga series Shaman King. It has been serialized in Kodansha's Shōnen Magazine Edge since May 2018.

Publication
Shaman King: The Super Star, written and illustrated by Hiroyuki Takei, was announced in December 2017. Three prologue chapters were released in Kodansha's Shōnen Magazine Edge on April 17, 2018. The series started in the magazine on May 17 of the same year. The manga went on a six-month hiatus between December 2018 and June 2019. In December 2019, it was announced that the manga was nearing its climax. Kodansha has collected its chapters into individual tankōbon volumes. The first volume was released on November 15, 2018. As of August 17, 2022, six volumes have been released.

In July 2020, Kodansha USA announced the digital English language release of the Shaman Kings spin-offs, and Shaman King: The Super Star was originally scheduled to be released on August 18, 2020. However, it was delayed to December of the same year. The first volume was released on December 1, while the fourth was released on December 29, 2020.

Volume list

References

External links
 

Kodansha manga
Shaman King
Shōnen manga